The 2021–22 FIS Alpine Ski Europa Cup was the fiftieth consecutive Europa Cup season, the second international level competition in alpine skiing.

On 1 March 2022, following the 2022 Russian invasion of Ukraine, FIS decided to exclude athletes from Russia and Belarus from FIS competitions, with an immediate effect.

Men

Calendar

Rankings

Overall

Downhill

Super-G

Giant slalom

Slalom

Women

Calendar

Rankings

Overall

Downhill

Super-G

Giant slalom

Slalom

References 

2021 in alpine skiing
2022 in alpine skiing
FIS Alpine Ski Europa Cup